Greg Broughton (born 29 September 1986) is a former professional Australian rules footballer who played for the Fremantle Football Club and Gold Coast Football Club in the Australian Football League (AFL).

After playing in Subiaco's 2006, 2007 and 2008 WAFL premiership winning teams and winning the 2008 Tom Outridge Medal as Subiaco's best and fairest player, Broughton was drafted to Fremantle in the 2009 Rookie Draft with Fremantle's final selection, number 74 overall.  After displaying good form as a small defender during the 2009 pre-season, he was elevated to Fremantle's senior list as a nominated rookie, along with Matt de Boer.

Broughton made his AFL debut for Fremantle in Round 3 of the 2009 AFL season at Subiaco Oval against Adelaide. In 2009, Broughton averaged 23 possessions with a high of 37 against Port Adelaide in Round 19.
	        
In December 2006, before he was drafted by Fremantle, Broughton suffered a fractured eye socket in a nightclub incident allegedly involving Fremantle players Jeff Farmer and Steven Dodd. Farmer retired from AFL football a few months before Broughton was drafted to Fremantle, but Dodd was a teammate of Broughton's.  No charges were laid following the incident.

Broughton's father, who is part Maori, was from Patea in New Zealand and moved to Australia when he was 20 years old.

He announced his retirement in September 2015, effective after the round 23 match against .

Statistics

|- style="background-color: #EAEAEA"
! scope="row" style="text-align:center" | 2009
|
| 48 || 15 || 2 || 2 || 153 || 191 || 344 || 95 || 47 || 0.1 || 0.1 || 10.2 || 12.7 || 22.9 || 6.3 || 3.1
|-
! scope="row" style="text-align:center" | 2010
|
| 6 || 17 || 2 || 0 || 210 || 203 || 413 || 95 || 57 || 0.1 || 0.0 || 12.4 || 11.9 || 24.3 || 5.6 || 3.4
|- style="background-color: #EAEAEA"
! scope="row" style="text-align:center" | 2011
|
| 6 || 21 || 5 || 5 || 246 || 213 || 459 || 86 || 84 || 0.2 || 0.2 || 11.7 || 10.1 || 21.9 || 4.1 || 4.0
|-
! scope="row" style="text-align:center" | 2012
|
| 6 || 15 || 6 || 3 || 129 || 141 || 270 || 62 || 79 || 0.4 || 0.2 || 8.6 || 9.4 || 18.0 || 4.1 || 5.3
|- style="background-color: #EAEAEA"
! scope="row" style="text-align:center" | 2013
|
| 36 || 17 || 2 || 0 || 145 || 152 || 297 || 68 || 47 || 0.1 || 0.0 || 8.5 || 8.9 || 17.5 || 4.0 || 2.8
|-
! scope="row" style="text-align:center" | 2014
|
| 36 || 20 || 2 || 4 || 154 || 195 || 349 || 84 || 73 || 0.1 || 0.2 || 7.7 || 9.8 || 17.5 || 4.2 || 3.7
|- style="background-color: #EAEAEA"
! scope="row" style="text-align:center" | 2015
|
| 36 || 5 || 0 || 0 || 16 || 33 || 49 || 9 || 10 || 0.0 || 0.0 || 3.2 || 6.6 || 9.8 || 1.8 || 2.0
|- class="sortbottom"
! colspan=3| Career
! 110
! 19
! 14
! 1053
! 1128
! 2181
! 499
! 397
! 0.2
! 0.1
! 9.6
! 10.3
! 19.8
! 4.5
! 3.6
|}

References

External links

WAFL Player Profile and Statistics

1986 births
Living people
Fremantle Football Club players
Subiaco Football Club players
Australian rules footballers from Western Australia
Australian people of Māori descent
Gold Coast Football Club players